Hasan Kemal Özdemir (born 9 February 1964) is a retired Turkish football defender. He was capped three times for Turkey, and was also a squad member at the 1983 Mediterranean Games.

References

1964 births
Living people
Turkish footballers
Association football wingers
Turkey international footballers
Fenerbahçe S.K. footballers
Sakaryaspor footballers
Adana Demirspor footballers
Alanyaspor footballers
Fenerbahçe football managers
Competitors at the 1983 Mediterranean Games
Mediterranean Games silver medalists for Turkey
Turkish football managers
Mediterranean Games medalists in football
People from Sinop, Turkey